The Blackburn Blackburd was a British prototype single-engine torpedo bomber developed by Blackburn Aircraft in 1918 as a replacement for the Sopwith Cuckoo. It was unsuccessful, only three being built.

Design and development
In January 1918, the Admiralty issued specification N.1B, seeking an aircraft to replace the Sopwith Cuckoo torpedo bomber. While the Cuckoo was successful, it could only carry a 1,000 lb (450 kg) Mark IX torpedo, which was not believed to be powerful enough to sink large armoured warships. The specification therefore required an aircraft capable of carrying a 1,436 lb (647 kg) Mark VII torpedo, which had a much larger warhead.

In response, Harris Booth designed the Blackburd, a large, three-bay biplane with unswept, unstaggered wings and a slab-sided fuselage. The Blackburd's simple lines were designed to facilitate rapid production, and the wings were able to fold backwards to allow storage in a ship's hangar.
Unusually, the pilot's cockpit was situated towards the rear of the aircraft, with 17 ft (5 m) of fuselage ahead of the windscreen. The Blackburd's undercarriage had to be jettisoned before the torpedo could be dropped, requiring the aircraft to land on steel skids.

The first Blackburd flew in May 1918, and was delivered to Martlesham Heath for evaluation against the Short Shirl.  The Blackburd was found to be unstable, with the first prototype crashing before trials were complete. The second and third aircraft were fitted with an enlarged rudder. The Blackburd was considered to be inferior to the Shirl, and was therefore not ordered. Although orders were placed for production of the Shirl, they were almost immediately cancelled in favour of more orders for the Sopwith Cuckoo.

Specifications

See also

References

1910s British bomber aircraft
Blackburd
Single-engined tractor aircraft
Biplanes
Aircraft first flown in 1918